The Long Tail: Why the Future of Business Is Selling Less of More is a  book by Chris Anderson, editor in chief of Wired magazine. The book was initially published on July 11, 2006, by Hyperion. The book, Anderson's first, is an expansion of his 2004 article The Long Tail in the magazine. The book was listed in The New York Times Nonfiction Best Sellers list. It was shortlisted for the Financial Times and Goldman Sachs Business Book of the Year Award on 18 September 2006.

Concept
The book argues that products in low demand or that have a low sales volume can collectively build a better market share than their rivals, or exceed the relatively few current bestsellers and blockbusters, provided the store or distribution channel is large enough. The term long tail has gained popularity as describing the retailing strategy of selling a large number of different items which each sell in relatively small quantities, usually in addition to selling large quantities of a small number of popular items. Chris Anderson popularized the concept in an October 2004 Wired magazine article, in which he mentioned Amazon.com, Apple and Yahoo! as examples of businesses applying this strategy.

Criticism

—Review by The New York Times

References

External links
Chris Anderson blog
The Wrong Tail: How to turn a powerful idea into a dubious theory of everything.

2006 non-fiction books
Business books